The following lists events that happened during 1990 in Laos.

Incumbents
President: Souphanouvong 
Prime Minister: Kaysone Phomvihane

Events
date unknown - The Lao Premier League is established.

Births
20 July - Chintana Souksavath, footballer
4 October - Phatthana Syvilay, footballer
3 November - Kanlaya Sysomvang, footballer
23 November - Khamla Pinkeo, footballer
2 December - Khamphoumy Hanvilay, footballer

References

 
Years of the 20th century in Laos
Laos
1990s in Laos
Laos